is a Japanese investor and businessman best known as the founder of the video game developer Square. Miyamoto graduated from Waseda University in 1983, and joined his father's electric power conglomerate, Den-Yu-Sha as a programmer in their software division. After transforming the games division from a group of generalist programmers into specialists working together on a common project, the group was spun out into its own company in 1986. Miyamoto served as president of the company until 1991, though he remained a major shareholder in the company.

Biography

Square
Miyamoto graduated from Waseda University in 1983, but he was not interested in joining his father's electric power conglomerate, Den-Yu-Sha, instead pondering a career in women's clothing manufacturing. He started his career developing computer games in the software division of Den-Yu-Sha at Yokohama. At the time, game development in Japan was usually conducted by only one programmer. Miyamoto recognized that it would be more efficient to have graphic designers, programmers, and professional story writers working together on common projects. To recruit for this new organizational structure, Miyamoto opened an Internet café-like salon in Yokohama and offered jobs to those who demonstrated exceptional programming skills. This strategy discovered Hisashi Suzuki, who would go on to become CEO of Square, and he in turn recruited Hironobu Sakaguchi, the eventual creator of Final Fantasy. In 1986, Miyamoto spun Square out from Den-Yu-Sha to become an independent company with a focus on making games for the Famicom video game system in Japan. He stepped down as president of Square in 1991.

Square Enix Merger
During the discussion of the merger of Square and Enix in 2002, his approval of the merger was essential because of his major stake in Square. Initially, the ratio of Square shares was to be 1 to .81 shares of Enix, which  Miyamoto objected to. When the merger went through, 1 share of Square resulted in 0.85 shares of Enix. Miyamoto made 5 million shares, or 9% of the company, available for purchase in the summer of 2002, but still retained 31.04% ownership. He is as of March 31, 2018 the tenth largest shareholder of Square Enix.

References

Square (video game company)
1957 births
Living people
Japanese businesspeople
Square Enix people